is a former Japanese politician who served as Prime Minister of Japan from 2007 to 2008. He was previously the longest-serving Chief Cabinet Secretary in Japanese history, serving in that role from 2000 to 2004 under Prime Ministers Yoshirō Mori and Junichiro Koizumi. His record was surpassed by Yoshihide Suga, who served almost twice as long. 

Following the resignation of Prime Minister Shinzō Abe, Fukuda was elected as President of the Liberal Democratic Party and became Prime Minister in September 2007. Fukuda was the first son of a former Japanese Prime Minister (Takeo Fukuda) to also take up the post. On 1 September 2008, Fukuda announced his resignation as party leader, and was succeeded by Taro Aso. Although Japan hosted the G8 summit meeting without mishap during Fukuda's time in office, he himself earned little or no credit from ordinary Japanese, and when he resigned, he became the first of the G8 leaders to leave office.

Early life

Fukuda was born in Takasaki, Gunma, the eldest son of politician (later the 67th Prime Minister) Takeo Fukuda. He grew up in Setagaya, Tokyo, attending Azabu High School and graduating from Waseda University in 1959 with a degree in economics. After university, he joined Maruzen Petroleum (now part of the Cosmo Oil Company). He was only minimally involved in politics over the next seventeen years, working his way up to section chief as a typical Japanese "salaryman". He was posted to the United States from 1962-64. While his father Takeo Fukuda was prime minister from 1976–78, Yasuo became a political secretary. From 1978 to 1989, he was a director of the Kinzai Institute for Financial Affairs, serving as a trustee from 1986 onward.

Fukuda also served as president of the Japanese Canoe Federation prior to his September 2007 election as Prime Minister.

Political career

Fukuda ran for the House of Representatives in 1990 and won a seat. He was elected deputy director of the Liberal Democratic Party in 1997 and became Chief Cabinet Secretary to Yoshirō Mori in October 2000. He resigned his position as Chief Cabinet Secretary on 7 May 2004 amid a large political scandal related to the Japanese pension system.

Fukuda was considered a contender for the leadership of the LDP in 2006, but, on 21 July, he decided that he would not seek the nomination. Instead, Shinzō Abe succeeded Junichirō Koizumi as leader of the LDP and Prime Minister of Japan. One of his most noted policy goals is to end prime ministerial visits to Yasukuni Shrine. In June 2006, Fukuda joined 134 other lawmakers in proposing a secular alternative to the shrine, citing constitutional concerns.

Election as Prime Minister

Following Abe's resignation in September 2007, Fukuda announced that he would run in the Liberal Democratic Party leadership election, which would also determine the prime minister, given the LDP's majority in the House of Representatives.

Fukuda received a great deal of support in his bid, including that of the LDP's largest faction, led by Foreign Minister Nobutaka Machimura, of which Fukuda is a member. Finance Minister Fukushiro Nukaga, who initially had intended to run for the leadership, also backed Fukuda. Fukuda's only competitor for the leadership, Tarō Asō, publicly acknowledged the likelihood of his own defeat a week before the election.

In the election, on 23 September, he defeated Aso, receiving 330 votes against Aso's 197. Fukuda was formally elected as Japan's 91st prime minister on 25 September. He received 338 votes, almost 100 more than necessary for a majority, in the House of Representatives; although the House of Councillors (the upper house), led by the opposition Democratic Party, elected Ichirō Ozawa over Fukuda by a margin of 133 to 106. This deadlock was then resolved in favor of the lower house's choice, according to Article 67 of the Constitution.

Fukuda and his cabinet were formally sworn in by Emperor Akihito on 26 September.

Censure motion
On 11 June 2008, a non-binding censure motion was passed by parliament's opposition-controlled upper house against Yasuo Fukuda. Filed by the Democratic Party of Japan and two other parties, it was the first censure motion against a prime minister under Japan's post-war constitution. Ahead of the G8 summit, it attacked his handling of domestic issues including an unpopular medical plan and called for a snap election or his resignation.

Motion of confidence 
On 12 June, a motion of confidence was passed by the lower house's ruling coalition to counter the censure.

Sudden resignation

On 1 September 2008, Fukuda announced his resignation, citing reasons related to improving the flow of the political process. The sudden announcement began with a call for an emergency press conference issued at 6:00 pm, The purpose not disclosed until 10 minutes prior to the scheduled start of the press conference. The resignation was widely compared to the sudden resignation of Abe a year earlier. Fukuda said that while Abe's resignation was due to health reasons, his own resignation was motivated by a desire to remove impediments to legislative and political process due to deadlock between his party and the opposition-controlled upper house of the Diet.

The resignation led to another leadership election within the LDP. Tarō Asō was viewed as the likely front-runner to replace Fukuda, and was elected a week later. His popularity was hit by a controversial medical plan for elderly people, falling below 30% at one stage. He said:Today, I have decided to resign. We need a new line-up to cope with a new session of parliament. My decision is based on what I thought the future political situation ought to be. The Democratic Party has tried to stall every bill so it has taken a long time to implement any policies. For the sake of the Japanese people, this should not be repeated. If we are to prioritize the people's livelihoods, there cannot be a political vacuum from political bargaining, or a lapse in policies. We need a new team to carry out policies.

Taro Aso was elected to succeed Fukuda as LDP President on 22 September. Fukuda and his cabinet resigned en masse on 24 September 2008, to make way for a new Cabinet headed by Aso. Aso was elected as Prime Minister by the House of Representatives on the same day.

Diplomacy
In June 2014, Fukuda visited Beijing for secret meetings with Chinese government officials. The meeting was seen as the first after nearly 18 months between a senior Japanese political leader and Chinese officials. During the meeting, Fukuda was passed the message that President Xi wanted to meet with the Japanese Prime Minister Abe. Following this, in late July Fukuda  conveyed the details of the discussion to Abe. On getting the consent from Abe, Fukuda returned to Beijing and on 28 July informed Xi about the consent from Abe, and thus laid the groundwork for the Japan-China summit that was held in November 2014.
In 2018, Fukuda met with Foreign Minister Wang Yi, during the 4th round of dialogue between entrepreneurs and former senior officials of China and Japan 

In July 2019, addressed the two-day Sino-US trade relations forum in Hong Kong,  attended by high-level attendees included former Chinese vice-premier Zeng Peiyan and other previous government heads and officials, as well as entrepreneurs and scholars from around the world. Fukuda urged China to seriously consider what role it wanted to play on the world stage, describing it as “the most serious issue of the era that we are faced with”...“Each step China takes not only affects relations between the United States and China, but also the entire world,” he said.

After Politics 
After retiring in 2012,  he is now the President of the Japan-Indonesia Association.

Controversies

Statements on "Super Free"
When Fukuda was Chief Cabinet Secretary to former Prime Minister Junichiro Koizumi he was reported to have made highly controversial comments during an off-the-record discussion with reporters in June 2003 regarding the victims of rape by male members of the Waseda University "Super Free" club, according to an article in the weekly magazine Shukan Bunshun.

The magazine quoted Fukuda as saying: "There are women who look like they are saying 'Do it to me'. Those who have that kind of appearance are at fault, because men are black panthers." In response, Fukuda claimed that the Shukan Bunshun had distorted his comments, stating that he had never intended to defend rape, and told a parliamentary panel afterward that rape was "a criminal act and an atrocious crime."

Refueling debate
One of the major issues during Fukuda's first months in office was the status of Japan's Indian Ocean refueling mission. After the 11 September attacks and the subsequent invasion of Afghanistan, the Diet passed a bill that allowed Japanese oil tankers to provide fuel for American ships involved in military operations. When Fukuda became Prime Minister he vowed to continue the mission, this despite the fact that the DPJ which opposed the authorization bill now had a majority in the upper house. After several months of debate and aborted attempts at compromise the upper house rejected the bill to continue the mission. However, the bill ultimately became law as Fukuda used the LDP's 2/3 majority in the lower house to win successful passage for the bill.

Cabinet
Fukuda's cabinet was formed on 26 September 2007. It was almost identical to Abe's. After his administration started, the Cabinet's approval rating continually declined. According to the Asahi Shimbun newspaper, in late April 2008 the disapproval rating of the Cabinet was 60 percent and the approval rating at 25 percent. Fukuda reshuffled his cabinet on 1 August 2008.

Gallery

Decorations 
In March 2008, Croatian president Stjepan Mesić presented Fukuda with the Grand Order of Queen Jelena with the Sash and the Croatian Morning Star. The decoration was given to Fukuda for his efforts in promoting friendly relations between Japan and Croatia.

See also

 Tokyo International Conference on African Development (TICAD-IV), 2008.

References

External links

 Prime Minister of Japan

1936 births
Living people
21st-century prime ministers of Japan
People from Takasaki, Gunma
Azabu High School alumni
Children of prime ministers of Japan
Government ministers of Japan
Presidents of the Liberal Democratic Party (Japan)
Members of the House of Representatives (Japan)
Prime Ministers of Japan
Waseda University alumni
21st-century Japanese politicians
Politicians from Gunma Prefecture